Eoophyla naumanni is a moth in the family of Crambidae. It was described by Speidel in 2003. It is found in the Philippines (Mindanao).

References

Eoophyla
Moths described in 2003